Cychramus is a genus of sap-feeding beetles in the family Nitidulidae. There are about six described species in Cychramus.

Species
These six species belong to the genus Cychramus:
 Cychramus adustus Erichson, 1843
 Cychramus castaneus (Blatchley, 1916)
 Cychramus luteus (Fabricius, 1787)
 Cychramus variegatoideus Hisamatsu, 2008
 Cychramus variegatus (Herbst, 1792)
 Cychramus zimmermanni Horn, 1879

References

Further reading

External links

 

Nitidulidae
Articles created by Qbugbot